Kyarha van Tiel (born 17 May 2000) is a Dutch retired figure skater. She is a two-time Open d'Andorra champion (2017, 2019). She competed in the final segment at the 2016 and 2018 World Junior Championships.

Career 
Van Tiel began skating at age six. She won the Dutch national ladies' title on the novice level in the 2013–2014 season. She made her junior international debut at an ISU Junior Grand Prix event in August 2014.

Van Tiel began the 2015–2016 season training under Astrid Tameling-Winkelman and Nathalie Oogjen in Dordrecht, Netherlands, before joining Kevin van der Perren, Jenna McCorkell, and Jérôme Blanchard in Liedekerke, Belgium. In March, she represented The Netherlands at the 2016 World Junior Championships in Debrecen, Hungary, where she qualified for the final segment. Ranked 17th in the short program and 20th in the free skate, she finished 18th overall.

Van Tiel also advanced to the free skate at the 2018 World Junior Championships in Sofia, Bulgaria, where she would finish 24th.

Van Tiel announced her retirement from figure skating on October 17, 2020.

Programs

Competitive highlights 
CS: Challenger Series; JGP: Junior Grand Prix

References

External links 
 

2000 births
Living people
Dutch female single skaters
Sportspeople from Rotterdam